WorldNow was a New York-based software company founded by Gary Gannaway. WorldNow offered an integrated media platform enabling broadcasters, operators, and media companies to create, acquire, manage, analyze, monetize and distribute media assets (text, images and videos) across all digital platforms and on-air systems in a unified, end-to-end workflow. Through its turnkey multi-tenant software-as-a-service solution, WorldNow unified web content management, IP video management and delivery, mobile, over-the-top, analytics, social and advertising in one integrated solution. WorldNow's customers included CBS, COX Communications, Dispatch, Fox Television, Meredith Corporation, Media General and Raycom Media.

In August 2015, WorldNow was acquired by San Francisco-based Frankly in a $45 million cash and stock deal, itself later acquired by and becoming a subsidiary of Nexstar Media Group.

Products
WorldNow's multi-tenant end-to-end platform could be licensed separately or as a fully integrated solution. WorldNow's platform as a service model provides complete control to develop, design and deploy custom workflows and consumer experiences with a complete set of rich APIs and SDKs. WorldNow's products include: web content management, online video platform, over-the-top (OTT), cross platform media logistics, mobile web and application and advertising monetization platform.

Notable clients

 Raycom Media, which also owned a 37% minority stake in the company.
 Fox Television Stations (2015)
 Waterman Broadcasting Corporation (2011)
 Meredith Corporation and WFLA-TV. (2011)
 Media General (2013)

References

Mass media companies based in New York City